Segment polarity protein dishevelled homolog DVL-2 is a protein that in humans is encoded by the DVL2 gene.

This gene encodes a member of the dishevelled (dsh) protein family. The vertebrate dsh proteins have approximately 40% amino acid sequence similarity with Drosophila dsh. This gene encodes a 90-kD protein that undergoes posttranslational phosphorylation to form a 95-kD cytoplasmic protein, which may play a role in the signal transduction pathway mediated by multiple Wnt proteins. The mechanisms of dishevelled function in Wnt signaling are likely to be conserved among metazoans.

Interactions
DVL2 has been shown to interact with Zinc finger protein 165, DAB2 and Arrestin beta 1.

See also
 Dishevelled

References

Further reading